"A Little More" is a song by American hip hop recording artist Machine Gun Kelly featuring American singer Victoria Monét, released on March 6, 2015 as the second single from his second studio album General Admission. The track was written by Kelly, Monét, Tommy Brown and Thomas Lumpkins, and produced by Brown.

Music video
The official music video was released on May 19, 2015 on Vevo.

Critical reception
Allmusic said that "when he holds Kurt Cobain up as an inspiration during "A Little More," it makes sense."

Usage in media
The song was used in the 2015 video game WWE 2K16.

Charts

Certifications

References

External links
Lyrics of this song at Genius

2015 singles
2015 songs
Machine Gun Kelly (musician) songs
Bad Boy Records singles
Interscope Records singles
Songs written by Victoria Monét
Songs written by Machine Gun Kelly (musician)
Songs written by Tommy Brown (record producer)
Songs written by Thomas Lumpkins